Angolachelys is an extinct genus of African eucryptodiran turtle which existed in Angola during the Turonian stage of the Late Cretaceous. The type species is Angolachelys mbaxi. The type MGUAN-PA includes skull, jaw, and postcranial fragments found in the Tadi Beds of the Itombe Formation.

Phylogeny 
 
Cladogram after Mateus et al. (2009).

References

Cryptodira
Prehistoric turtle genera
Turonian life
Late Cretaceous reptiles of Africa
 
Fossil taxa described in 2009